Westfield Township, Illinois may refer to one of the following townships:

 Westfield Township, Bureau County, Illinois
 Westfield Township, Clark County, Illinois

See also

Westfield Township (disambiguation)

Illinois township disambiguation pages